Beauvais-sur-Tescou (literally Beauvais on Tescou) is a commune in the Tarn department of southern France.

See also
Communes of the Tarn department

References

Communes of Tarn (department)